A number of experimental and broadcast pre World War II television systems were tested. The first ones were mechanical based (mechanical television) and of very low resolution, sometimes with no sound. Later TV systems were electronic (electronic television). 

For a list of mechanical system tests and development, see mechanical television. For a station list see Prewar television stations

France 
 France 1930 (mechanical): 30 lines, 12.5 frame/s
 France 1932 (mechanical): 60 lines, 12.5 frame/s, 3:7 vertical aspect ratio, vertical scanning ~35×60 pixels per frame, sound, live images
 France 1935-1936 (electronic): 180 lines
 France 1937-1939 (electronic): 455 lines, developed by Rene Barthelemy
 France 1943-1956 (electronic): 441 lines

Germany 
 Doberitz 1932 (mechanical): 48 lines, 25 frame/s, 4:3 horizontal aspect ratio, ~64×48 pixels per frame, sound, talking movies
 Berlin R.P.Z. 1932 (mechanical): 60 lines, 25 frame/s, 4:3 horizontal aspect ratio, ~83×60 pixels per frame, test movies and live images
 Germany 1932: 90 lines
 Germany 1935:  180 lines

 Germany 1936:  375 lines
 Germany 1937: 441 lines, 25 frame/s, line frequency 11,025 Hz. Vision 46.0 MHz Sound 43.2 MHz.
 Germany 1940: 1,000 lines signal projection, no glass screen but projection screen (successful experiments in Reichspost laboratories, but no mass production, note that in Germany public telegraphy, telephone, and radio services were subject to the Reichspostministerium since the early 20th century, and TV was regarded a postal issue as well until the 1980s)

Netherlands 
 Netherlands 1930s:  441 lines, 25 frame/s, line frequency 11,025 Hz
 Late 1940s: 567 lines

Poland 
 Warsaw 1937 (mechanical): 120 lines, test movies and live images from a studio
 Electronic TV (343 lines) was under development and was publicly demonstrated during the Radio Exhibition in Warsaw in August 1939, regular operations planned to start at the beginning of 1940, work stopped because of the outbreak of World War II.

Switzerland
 Switzerland 1932 (mechanical): 30 lines, 16.6 frame/s, 4:3 horizontal aspect ratio, ~40×30 pixels per frame, test movies and live images

Italy 

During the 1930s there were also experimental transmissions from the Vatican - but further details are unknown. Later Arturo Castellani emerges as the main figure being early regular broadcasts.
Italy 1932 (mechanical): 60 lines, 20 frame/s, 4:3 horizontal aspect ratio, ~45x60 pixels per frame, test movies and live images
Italy 1937 (electronic): 375 lines, 25 frame/s, 4:3 horizontal aspect ratio, daily from Rome, between 6pm and 9.30pm on 6.9 meters with a power of 2 kW
Italy 1939 (electronic): 441 lines, 25 frame/s, 4:3 horizontal aspect ratio, regular service from Rome and Milan. 2 kW transmission power on VHF 45 MHz

UK

Mechanical
 England 1926 (Baird mechanical): 30 lines, 5 frame/s, black-and-white experimental transmissions
 England 1928 (Baird mechanical): 30 lines, 5 frame/s, first experimental colour TV transmissions
 London 1932 (Baird mechanical): 30 lines, 12.5 frame/s, 3:7 vertical aspect ratio, vertical scanning, ~70×30 pixels per frame, sound, live TV from studio  
 England 1936 (Baird): 240 lines, 25 frame/s, line frequency 6000 Hz, used from November 1936 to February 1937

Electronic
 UK (1936, EMI): 405 lines / 50 Hz. Used by the BBC Alexandra Palace television station initially from November 1936 to 1939 and then 1946 to 1985 (interruption due to Second World War). 
 The EMI 405 lines system was the first to have an ITU System Letter Designation, and is known as System A. As the EMI system predates PAL, there is no PAL designator in the ITU television system table.

USSR 
 1932 (mechanical): 30 lines, 12.5 frame/s, 4:3 horizontal aspect ratio, ~40x30 pixels per frame, test movies and live images
 Leningrad (St. Petersburg), 1935 (electronic): 180 lines, 25 frame/s with progressive scanning
 Leningrad (St. Petersburg), 1937 (electronic): 240 lines, 25 frame/s with progressive scanning
 Moscow, 1938 (electronic): 343 lines, 25 frame/s, 4:3 horizontal aspect ratio (RCA provided broadcast equipment and documentation for TV sets)

North America 
 USA 1933: 240 lines
 USA 1936: 343 lines; limited public demonstrations in New York City (RCA) and Philadelphia (Philco). Field tests in Los Angeles used various line systems, but adopted RCA's 441 lines system by 1938.
 USA 1938-9: First TV receivers sold on a very limited basis, mostly in New York. Manufacturers included RCA, General Electric, DuMont, and Andrea.
 USA 1937-1941: 441 lines @ 30 fps (RCA) and 605 lines (Proposed by Philco).
 USA 1941-1945: 375 lines @ 60fps field sequential color, tested by CBS in New York.

See also 
 Timeline of the BBC
 History of television
 Timeline of the introduction of television in countries
 Timeline of the introduction of colour television in countries
 Geographical usage of television
 Moving image formats
 Oldest radio station
 Prewar television stations
 List of experimental television stations
 Narrow-bandwidth television
 Oldest television station
 Early television stations

Individual television stations 
 WRGB
 WNBC-TV
 WCBS-TV
 KCBS-TV
 BBC/BBC Television
 Fernsehsender Paul Nipkow

Broadcast television systems 
 405-line television system
 576-lines
 625-lines
 819-line television system
 NTSC
 PAL
 SECAM

Related topics in television systems
 Mechanical television
 180-line television system
 375-line television system
 441-line television system
 Narrow-bandwidth television
 Display resolution

References

External links
 (in German) Rolf Wigand: Technische Beschreibung des E 1 (Zeitgenössischer Artikel in „Radio-Mentor", pdf 295 kB)
 (in German) Eckhard Etzold: Ausführliche Webseite mit vielen Fotos sowie Schaltbild des E 1

History of television